Karen Grace McCombie (born 28 August 1963 in Aberdeen, Scotland) is an author of children and young adult novels.  Currently, she lives in London with her husband Tom, and their 19-year-old son Eddy She is the author of the series Stella Etc., Ally's World, Indie Kidd, Sadie Rocks, and You, Me and Thing.  She has also written twelve stand-alone novels.

Ally's World character Rowan Love also stars in The Raspberry Rules.

Series

Ally's World
 The Past, the Present and the Loud, Loud Girl
 Dates, Double Dates and Big, Big Trouble
 Butterflies, Bullies and Bad, Bad Habits
 Friends, Freak-outs and Very Secret Secrets
 Boys, Brothers and Jelly-Belly Dancing
 Sisters, Super-creeps and Slushy, Gushy Love Songs
 Parties, Predicaments and Undercover Pets
 Tattoos, Tell-tales and Terrible, Terrible Twins
 Mates, Mysteries and Pretty Weird Weirdness
 Daisy, Dad and the Huge, Small Surprise
 Rainbows, Rowan and True, True Romance (?)
 Visitors, Vanishings and Va-Va-Va Voom
 Crushes, Cliques and the Cool, School Trip
 Hassles, Heart-pings!, and Sad, Happy Endings
 Sunshine, Sunburn And Not-So-Sweet-Nothings  (Summer special)
 Angels, Arguments and a Furry, Merry Christmas (Christmas special, prequel to main series)
Plus:
 A Guided Tour of Ally's World
 My V. Groovy Ally's World Journal

Stella’s World.
 Frankie, Peaches and Me
 Sweet-Talking TJ
 Meet The Real World, Rachel
 Truly, Madly Megan
 Amber and the Hot Pepper Jelly
 Twists, Turns and 100% Tilda
 Forever and Ever and Evie

Indie Kidd
 How to be Good(ish)
 Oops, I Lost My Best(est) Friends
 Being Grown-Up Is Cool (Not)
 Are We Having Fun Yet? (Hmm?)
 Wow, I’m a Gazillionaire! (I Wish...)
 My Big (Strange) Happy Family
 Me and the School (un)Fair
 I Spy a (Not So) White Lie
Specials:
 My (Most Excellent) Pet Project
 Indie Kidd's (Most Excellent) Best Friend Guide
 Indie Kidd's (Most Excellent) Guide to Fun for Free

Sadie Rocks!
 Happiness, And All That Stuff
 Deep Joy, Or Something Like It
 It's All Good (In Your Dreams)
 Smile! It's Meant To Be Fun

You, Me and Thing
 The Curse of the Jelly Babies
 The Dreaded Noodle-doodle
 The Legend of the Loch Ness Lilo
 The Mummy That Went Moo

Angels Next Door
 Angels Next Door
 Angels in Training
 Angels Like Me

St Grizzle's
 St Grizzle's School for Girls, Goats and Random Boys
 St Grizzle's School for Girls, Ghosts and Runaway Grannies
 St Grizzle's School for Girls, Geeks and Tag-along Zombies
 St Grizzle's School for Girls, Gremlins and Pesky Guests

Stand-Alone novels
 An Urgent Message Of Wowness
 Marshmallow Magic And The Wild Rose Rouge
 The Seventeen Secrets Of The Karma Club
 The Raspberry Rules ( which has Roman love in )
 Six Words And A Wish
 My Funny Valentine
 Bliss...
 Wonderland (this and the two above form a trilogy)
 In Sarah's Shadow
 Love is the Drug
 My Sister, the Superbitch
 The Girl Who Wasn't There
Little Bird Flies
The OMG Blog

References

External links 

 Official Site
 Author Profile

Living people
Scottish writers
1963 births
British writers of young adult literature
Scottish women novelists
Women writers of young adult literature